Butner is a town in Granville County, North Carolina, United States. The population was 8,397 as of the 2020 census. Butner was managed by the state of North Carolina from 1947 through 2007.

History
A bill passed by the North Carolina General Assembly incorporating the town was signed by Gov. Mike Easley on July 27, 2007.

It is the former site of the U.S. Army's Camp Butner, which was named for Major General Henry W. Butner (1875–1937), a North Carolina native. The area around Butner has several state and federal correctional institutions.

Geography
Butner is located in southwestern Granville County at  (36.138298, -78.758828). Interstate 85 passes through the town, southeast of the town center, with access from Exits 186, 189, and 191. I-85 leads northeast  to Oxford, the Granville County seat, and southwest  to Durham. Butner is bordered to the east by the city of Creedmoor.

Demographics

2020 census

As of the 2020 United States census, there were 8,397 people, 2,865 households, and 2,022 families residing in the town.

2010 census
As of the census of 2010, there were 7,591 people in 2,767 households. The population density was 1150.2 people per square mile (441.3/km2). There were 2,999 housing units at an average density of 454.4/sq mi (174.4/km2). The racial makeup of the town was 59.5% White, 30.1% African American, 0.7% Native American, 0.8% Asian, 6.5% from other races, and 2.3% from two or more races. Hispanic or Latino of any race were 14.7% of the population.

There were 2,767 households, out of which 33.0% had children under the age of 18 living with them. The average household size was 2.74. In the town, the population was spread out, with 26.0% under the age of 18, 7.6% from 18 to 24, 13.8% from 25 to 34, 23.3% from 35-49, 18.8% from 50 to 64, and 10.4% who were 65 years of age or older. For every 100 females, there were 97.3 males.

The median income for a household in the town was $45,437, and the mean income for a household was $51,466. The median and mean incomes for families were $53,186 and $55,847, respectively. The per capita income for the town was $17,654. About 4.1% of families and 13.5% of the population were below the poverty line, including 9.2% of those under age 18 and 12.8% of those age 65 or over.

Government
The Mayor of the Town of Butner is Terry Turner.

The Butner Town Council members are:

 Linda Jordon
 Michel D. Branch
Judy Cheek
 Thomas W. Lane
 Bill McKellar
 Vickie Smoak

Infrastructure
The area surrounding Butner includes:
 Camp Butner Training Center (Ran by the North Carolina National Guard, consisting of roughly 5,000 acres)
 Federal Correctional Complex, Butner (4 units and one medical center, consisting of Camp Butner for males only, FCI Butner Low, FCI Butner Medium I, FCI Butner Medium II, and Federal Medical Center)
 Polk Correctional Institution, a facility of the North Carolina Department of Correction
 C.A. Dillon Youth Development Center, a juvenile facility of the North Carolina Department of Public Safety (formerly the North Carolina Department of Juvenile Justice and Delinquency Prevention)
 Several facilities of the North Carolina Department of Health and Human Services (Murdoch Developmental Center, Whitaker School, R. J. Blackley Alcohol and Drug Abuse Treatment Center, and Central Regional Hospital replacing John Umstead Hospital in Butner as well as Dorothea Dix Hospital in Raleigh).

References

External links

 
 North Carolina Historical Marker: Camp Butner
 Town of Butner at Blogspot

Towns in Granville County, North Carolina
Towns in North Carolina
Research Triangle
Interstate 85